Exema conspersa is a species of warty leaf beetle in the family Chrysomelidae. It is found in Central America and North America.

References

Further reading

 

Cryptocephalinae
Articles created by Qbugbot
Beetles described in 1843
Beetles of North America
Beetles of Central America